The Théâtre-Musée des Capucines, also known as the Théâtre musée des Capucines-Fragonard, is a private museum dedicated to perfume, and located in the 2nd arrondissement of Paris at 39, boulevard des Capucines, Paris, France. It closes on Sundays; admission is free.

The museum was created in 1993 by the Fragonard perfume company within a former theater, the Théâtre des Capucines, dating to 1889. It exhibits 19th-century copper distilling apparatus, alembics, flasks, pots-pourris, and perfume roasters, as well as the animals and plants that provide raw materials for perfumes. A collection of perfume bottles illustrates 3000 years of perfume making.

See also 
 Musée du Parfum, another Fragonard perfume museum in Paris
 List of museums in Paris

References 
 Théâtre-Musée des Capucines - official site 
 Linternaute entry (French)
 ParisInfo entry (French)
 Randos.org description (French)

Museums in Paris
Perfumery
Buildings and structures in the 2nd arrondissement of Paris
Fashion museums in France
Museums established in 1993
1993 establishments in France